Ready to Dare is the only studio album by Belgian dance act AnnaGrace. The album was released on 7 June 2010 and includes the singles "You Make Me Feel", "Let the Feelings Go", "Love Keeps Calling", "Celebration" and "Don't Let Go".

Track listing

References

2010 debut albums
AnnaGrace albums